The Van Lyell House, now the centerpiece of the Hamilton House Estate bed and breakfast, is a historic house at 130 Van Lyell Terrace in Hot Springs, Arkansas.  It is a two-story buff brick structure, built with Mediterranean styling.  It was built in 1931, at about the same time that Carpenter Dam was under construction, impounding Lake Hamilton on whose shores it stands.  It was built by Van Lyell, owner of the Hot Springs Coca-Cola franchise.

The house was listed on the National Register of Historic Places in 2004.

See also
National Register of Historic Places listings in Garland County, Arkansas

References

External links
Hamilton House Estate web site

Houses on the National Register of Historic Places in Arkansas
Mission Revival architecture in Arkansas
Houses completed in 1931
Houses in Hot Springs, Arkansas
National Register of Historic Places in Hot Springs, Arkansas